Ty Burr (born August 17, 1957) is an American film critic, columnist, and author who currently writes a film and popular culture newsletter "Ty Burr's Watchlist" on Substack. Burr previously served as film critic at The Boston Globe from 2002 until 2021.

Early life
Born on August 17, 1957, in Boston, Burr grew up in Brookline, Massachusetts. He studied film at Dartmouth College and New York University.

Career

From 1982 to 1987, Burr worked at Home Box Office, where he helped program the Cinemax pay cable service as a film evaluator.

From 1990 to 2002, he was a senior writer at Entertainment Weekly, where he primarily covered films, video, music, and digital media. An early interest in the Internet led to his hand-coding the first EW web page and introducing and editing the magazine's New Media section.

For two decades, until July 2021, Burr served as the film critic for The Boston Globe. Beginning in January 2015, he also wrote a weekly Sunday column on a wide variety of pop culture subjects. His columns on breaking cultural issues frequently appeared on the paper's front page. In 2017, Burr was a finalist for the Pulitzer Prize in Criticism.

In July 2021, Burr left the Globe to start "Ty Burr's Watch List", a Substack newsletter devoted to reviews of and commentary on theatrical and streaming films, TV, and other popular culture.

Burr is a member of the Boston Society of Film Critics and the National Society of Film Critics. He has written articles for The New York Times, Spin, and The Boston Phoenix, among many other publications. He has appeared on NECN, MSNBC, WGBH's Greater Boston, NPR's Here and Now, Bloomberg Radio, and other local and national radio programs to discuss films and cultural matters.

Published works 
Burr has written or contributed to five books. The Hundred Greatest Stars of All Time (1998) and The Hundred Greatest Movies of All Time (1999) are Entertainment Weekly "bookazines," written largely by Burr (with additional material by other staff writers) during his tenure at the magazine.

In 2007, Burr wrote The Best Old Movies for Families: A Guide to Watching Together, an essay-based reference book for parents and grandparents seeking to introduce young children to classic films. It received uniformly positive reviews from critics and readers. In 2012, Burr wrote Gods Like Us: On Movie Stardom and Modern Fame, a critical study of celebrity over a hundred years of film and cultural history. It was widely and positively reviewed, with The New York Times saying, "not many film historians can see the whole equation as Ty Burr does in Gods Like Us," and the Buffalo News calling it "A brilliant and even profound history of stardom."

In 2012, Burr published the e-Book The 50 Movie Starter Kit: What You Need to Know if You Want to Know What You're Talking About, a guide for beginning film lovers.

References

Bibliography
The Hundred Greatest Stars of All Time. New York: Entertainment Weekly Books, 1999. 
The Best Old Movies for Families: A Guide to Watching Together. New York: Anchor Books, 2007. 
Gods Like Us: On Movie Stardom and Modern Fame. New York: Pantheon Books, 2012. 
The 50 Movie Starter Kit: What You Need to Know if You Want to Know What You're Talking About. New York: Anchor Books (eBook), 2012.

External links
Ty Burr's Watch List
Ty Burr's Pulitzer Prize citation
Ty Burr on Rotten Tomatoes
Ty Burr on Metacritic
Ty Burr's official home page (out of date)
why-the- hollywood-star- machine-made- gods-like-us Terry Gross Fresh Air interview, 3/25/13

1957 births
American film critics
National Society of Film Critics Members
The Boston Globe people
Dartmouth College alumni
Living people
Place of birth missing (living people)
Journalists from Massachusetts
Writers from Boston
Writers from Brookline, Massachusetts
20th-century American journalists
American male journalists
20th-century American male writers
21st-century American journalists
21st-century American male writers